Alperton is an area of north west London, England, within the London Borough of Brent. It includes a handful of high-rise and many mid-rise buildings as well as streets of low-rise houses with gardens. It adjoins the Grand Union Canal's Paddington Arm, which is fed by the Brent Reservoir.

Toponymy
The name Alperton means "farmstead or estate associated with a man named Ealhbeorht", deriving from an Anglo-Saxon personal name and tūn, meaning farmstead or village in Old English.

Demography

Alperton has one of the capital's highest populations from black or minority ethnic groups (BME). In the 1991 census, 43.2% of Alperton ward's population was Asian, only one point less than White. British Indians formed 31.5% in 1991 and 32.4% in 2001, with white having decreased to 27.8%. According to the 2011 census, the largest ethnic group was Indian, 42% of the population, well above Brent's average of 18%. Other Asian was second largest at 17%. The most spoken foreign language was Gujarati, by 3,213 residents, followed by Tamil, spoken by 1,001 residents. In the 2011 census 47.7% of residents are of the Hindu faith, Christians: 27.2% and Muslims: 11.9%.

Transport

Road

Ealing Road (A4089) and Bridgewater Road (A4005) are major roads that run through Alperton. Alperton Lane (B456) is another useful thoroughfare. The A406 North Circular Road passes by the east of Alperton.

The Grand Union Canal runs through Alperton and the Grand Union Walk is its old towpath, which was originally used by horses drawing the canal barges, and is now a recreational facility that serves Alperton.

Trains
Alperton station is on the Piccadilly line and located in the district. Other close stations include Hanger Lane (Central line) to the south; Stonebridge Park (Bakerloo line & Watford DC Line) to the east; and Wembley Central (Bakerloo line, London Overground's Watford DC Line, Southern & West Midlands Trains) to the north.

Notable people
 Keith Moon, drummer with The Who, lived in Alperton as a boy.
 Chess endgame study composer and author John Roycroft was born in Alperton
 Gary Waddock, former footballer and now manager of Aldershot Town, grew up in Alperton
 Footballer Joe Wiggins (1909–82) was born in Alperton

In popular culture

The towpath of the Grand Union Canal in Alperton has been used for various scenes in the BBC TV soap EastEnders. It was first used in an episode which aired on 3 October 1985, when the character Den Watts (played by Leslie Grantham) meets Michelle Fowler (played by Susan Tully) and it is revealed Den is the father of Michelle's baby. It was used again on numerous occasions, most famously on 23 February 1989, when Den Watts was shot before falling into the canal and supposedly dying. Den returned to the canal with daughter Sharon Watts on 3 October 2003, when he returned to Albert Square alive.

Schools 

 Alperton Community School: The school is divided into two sites: the lower school on Ealing Road near Alperton Underground station, consisting of Years 7, 8 and 9 and the upper school on Stanley Avenue, consisting of Years 10, 11, 12 and 13. The lower school has recently been renovated and it benefits from state of the art learning facilities.

Locale

Neighbouring areas

References

External links
History of Alperton at Brent Heritage 
News and information about developments in central Alperton at Alperton.org

Areas of London
Districts of the London Borough of Brent
Places formerly in Middlesex